Fernando Niembro (born 7 December 1947 in Buenos Aires) is an Argentine sports journalist and announcer.

Biography
Niembro was born amid a medium-class family in Parque Chacabuco. He is son of Paulino Niembro, a notable syndicalist during the 1970s.

During the government of Carlos Menem he was appointed as "media secretary", one of his tasks was to announce the Presidential Pardon for perpetrators of state terrorism in Argentina and members of insurgent groups the 1970s.

Since then he has had a long career as a sports journalist. Currently he hosts La Última Palabra in Fox Sports Latinoamérica (in the south feed). Previously he hosted some sports programs including Vamos con Niembro in AM Del Plata.

In 2013 Konami announced that Niembro, along with his colleague Mariano Closs will be the narrators in the Latin-American version of PES 2014, replacing the original Mexican voices.

Politics 
Niembro expressed interest in accompanying the PRO in the place that Macri determines.  Thus he headed the list of candidates for national deputy for the Province of Buenos Aires by the Cambiemos Front, composed of the PRO, UCR and the Civic Coalition.  On September 16, 2015, Niembro submitted his resignation to his candidacy, due to complaints to La Usina and his contract with the Government of the City of Buenos Aires.

References

1947 births
Living people
People from Buenos Aires
Argentine people of Spanish descent
Argentine radio presenters
Argentine television journalists
Argentine sports journalists